Fürstenberg (also Fuerstenberg and Furstenberg) may refer to:

Historical states 
 Fürstenberg-Baar, county (1441–1559)
 Fürstenberg-Blumberg, county (1559–1614)
 Fürstenberg-Donaueschingen, county (1617–1698)
 Fürstenberg-Fürstenberg, county (1408–1441, 1704–1716) and principality (1716–1804)
 Fürstenberg-Geisingen, county (1441–1483)
 Fürstenberg-Heiligenberg, county (1559–1664) and principality (1664–1716)
 Fürstenberg-Messkirch, county (1614–1716) and principality (1716–1744)
 Fürstenberg-Möhringen, county (1599–1641)
 Fürstenberg-Pürglitz, principality (1762–1806)
 Fürstenberg-Stühlingen, county (1614–1704)
 Fürstenberg-Taikowitz, county (1759–1806)
 Fürstenberg-Weitra, county (1705–1806)
 Fürstenberg-Wolfach, county (1408–1490)
 Principality of Fürstenberg, county (1250–1408) and principality

Cities and municipalities 
 Fürstenberg/Havel, a city in the district of Oberhavel, Brandenburg, Germany
 Fürstenberg, Lower Saxony, a municipality in the district Holzminden, Lower Saxony, Germany
 Fürstenberg, part of Eisenhüttenstadt, Brandenburg, Germany
 A quarter of Xanten in the district of Wesel (North Rhine-Westphalia), Germany
 A part of Lichtenfels, Hesse, Germany
 A quarter of Bad Wünnenberg, Paderborn, North Rhine-Westphalia, Germany

Castles
 Fürstenberg Castle (Rheindiebach), castle ruin near Oberdiebach-Rheindiebach in Landkreis Mainz-Bingen in Rheinland-Pfalz
 Fürstenberg Castle (Hüfingen), Hüfingen-Fürstenberg, Baden-Württemberg
 Fürstenberg Castle (Höingen), Ense, North Rhine-Westphalia

Noble families 
 House of Fürstenberg (Swabia), from Swabia (now southern Baden-Württemberg), Germany
 House of Fürstenberg (Westphalia), from Westphalia, Germany

Family name 
 Clara Agnelli, the former Princess Clara von Fürstenberg (1920–2016), Italian socialite
 Prince Alexander von Fürstenberg (born 1970), son of Diane von Fürstenberg, fashion designer
 Alexandra von Fürstenberg (born 1972), American image director for DvF
 Virginia von Fürstenberg (born 1974), Italian fashion designer and artist
 Betsy von Furstenberg (1931–2015), German-American actress and writer
 Carl Fürstenberg (1850–1933), German prominent banker
 Diane von Fürstenberg (born 1946), Belgian-American fashion designer
 Eleonore of Fürstenberg (1523–1544), daughter of Count Frederick III of Fürstenberg
 Elisabeth zu Fürstenberg (1767–1822), Princess consort of Fürstenberg
 Prince Egon von Fürstenberg (1946–2004), fashion designer
 Franz Egon von Fürstenberg-Heiligenberg (1625–1682), bishop of Strassburg
 Franz Egon von Fürstenberg-Stammheim (1797–1859), German landowner and politician
 Franz Friedrich Wilhelm von Fürstenberg (1729–1810), German statesman
 Hillel Furstenberg (born 1935), Israeli mathematician
 Ira von Fürstenberg (born 1940), European socialite and actress
 Jeannette zu Fürstenberg (born 1982), German businesswoman
 Joachim of Fürstenberg (1538–1598), Count of Fürstenberg
 Karl Aloys zu Fürstenberg (1760–1799), soldier in the Austrian service
 Matilde Borromeo, the Princess Matilde zu Fürstenberg (born 1983), Italian equestrian
 Maximilian von Fürstenberg (1904–1988), cardinal of the Roman Catholic Church
 Pontus Fürstenberg (1827–1902), Swedish art collector and merchant from a Jewish family
 Talita von Fürstenberg (born 1999), granddaughter of Diane von Fürstenberg, model and socialite
 Tatiana von Fürstenberg (born 1971), American rock singer and filmmaker
 Wilhelm Egon von Fürstenberg (1629–1704), German clergyman and bishop of Strasbourg
 Yakov Ganetsky/Hanecki, real name Jakub Fürstenberg, Bolshevik revolutionary

Other 
 Fürstenberg (Baar), a mountain of Baden-Württemberg, Germany
 Fürstenberg Brewery (Fürstlich Fürstenbergische Brauerei), a brewery
 Fürstenberg China (Porzellanmanufaktur Fürstenberg), a porcelain factory
 Furstenberg's rosette, an anatomical structure located in the internal streak canal of the teat

See also 
 Fürstenberg Castle (disambiguation)
 Ferdinand of Fürstenberg (disambiguation)
 Fürstenfeld
 Fürst (surname)

German-language surnames
Jewish surnames